Statistics of Empress's Cup in the 1993 season.

Overview
It was contested by 20 teams, and Yomiuri Nippon SC Beleza won the championship.

Results

1st round
Ota Gal 1-2 Fujita Tendai SC Mercury
Urawa Motobuto 6-1 Ishinomaki Women's Commercial High School
Shimizudaihachi SC 4-0 Sapporo Daiichi
Matsushita Electric LSC Bambina 10-0 Ozu High School

2nd round
Yomiuri Nippon SC Beleza 3-0 Fujita Tendai SC Mercury
Tasaki Perule FC 0-0 (pen 4-3) Tokyo Shidax LSC
Shiroki FC Serena 6-0 Hatsukaichi High School
Urawa Motobuto 0-7 Nissan FC
Nikko Securities Dream Ladies 6-1 Shimizudaihachi SC
Nawashiro Ladies 0-6 Prima Ham FC Kunoichi
Asahi Kokusai Bunnys 1-0 Nippon Sport Science University
Matsushita Electric LSC Bambina 1-1 (pen 4-3) Suzuyo Shimizu FC Lovely Ladies

Quarterfinals
Yomiuri Nippon SC Beleza 5-1 Tasaki Perule FC
Shiroki FC Serena 1-1 (pen 5-3) Nissan FC
Nikko Securities Dream Ladies 0-2 Prima Ham FC Kunoichi
Asahi Kokusai Bunnys 0-2 Matsushita Electric LSC Bambina

Semifinals
Yomiuri Nippon SC Beleza 2-1 Shiroki FC Serena
Prima Ham FC Kunoichi 1-0 Matsushita Electric LSC Bambina

Final
Yomiuri Nippon SC Beleza 2-0 Prima Ham FC Kunoichi
Yomiuri Nippon SC Beleza won the championship.

References

Empress's Cup
1993 in Japanese women's football